E99 can refer to:
 King's Indian Defense, Encyclopaedia of Chess Openings code
 E 99 road (United Arab Emirates), a road in the United Arab Emirates
 Embraer R-99, an aircraft type
 European route E99, European road in Turkey
 Element 99, a fictional element in the video game Singularity.